VA-27 has the following meanings:
Attack Squadron 27 (U.S. Navy)
State Route 27 (Virginia)